Lies may refer to:

 Lie, an untruthful statement
 Lies (evidence), falsehoods in common law

Geography
 Lies, Hautes-Pyrénées, a commune in Occitanie region, France
 Lies, Friesland, a village on the island of Terschelling, Friesland, the Netherlands
 Lies, North Brabant, a hamlet in Breda, North Brabant, the Netherlands

Books
 Lies (Gone series), the third book of Michael Grant's series
 Lies, Inc., an expanded version of the 1964 book The Unteleported Man by Philip K. Dick

Film and television
 Lies (1999 film), a South Korean film directed by Jang Sun-wu
 Lies (1983 film), a film by Ken and Jim Wheat
 Lies (2008 film), a Swedish short film directed by Jonas Odell
 "Lies" (The Black Donnellys), a 2007 television episode
 "Lies" (Roseanne), a 1992 television episode

Music
 L.I.E.S., an American electronic music record label

Albums
 Lies (Guns N' Roses album) or G N' R Lies, 1988
 Lies, by Blodwyn Pig, 1993
 Lies, by Bon Voyage, 2008
 Lies, by Heartbreak, 2008

Songs
 "Lies" (1931 song), written by Harry Barris and George E. Springer
 "Lies" (Anette Olzon song), 2014
 "Lies" (Big Bang song), 2007
 "Lies" (Burns song), 2012
 "Lies" (En Vogue song), 1990
 "Lies" (g.o.d song), 2000
 "Lies" (Jonathan Butler song), 1987
 "Lies" (The Knickerbockers song), 1965
 "Lies" (Koda Kumi song), 2006
 "Lies" (McFly song), 2008
 "Lies" (Rolling Stones song), 1978
 "Lies" (Status Quo song), 1980
 "Lies" (Thompson Twins song), 1982
 "Lies", by Alphaville from Forever Young, 1984
 "Lies", by Billy Talent from Billy Talent, 2003
 "Lies", by the Black Keys from Attack & Release, 2008
 "Lies", by Chvrches from The Bones of What You Believe, 2013
 "Lies", by the Click Five from Greetings from Imrie House, 2005
 "Lies", by Dillon Francis from This Mixtape Is Fire, 2015
 "Lies", by Elton John from Made in England, 1995
 "Lies", by EMF from Schubert Dip, 1991
 "Lies", by Evanescence from Origin, 2000
 "Lies", by Fenech-Soler, 2009
 "Lies", by Hercules and Love Affair from Omnion, 2017
 "Lies", by Hilary Duff from Breathe In. Breathe Out., 2015
 "Lies", by J. J. Cale from Really, 1973
 "Lies", by James Maslow, 2015
 "Lies", by Korn from Korn, 1994
 "Lies", by Marina and the Diamonds from Electra Heart, 2012
 "Lies", by MC Magic from Magic City, 2006
 "Lies", by Pale Waves from Unwanted, 2022
 "Lies", by Pet Shop Boys, a B-side of the single "You Only Tell Me You Love Me When You're Drunk", 2000
 "Lies", by Roxette from Crash! Boom! Bang!, 1994
 "Lies", by the Saturdays from Chasing Lights, 2008
 "Lies", by Schoolboy Q from Crash Talk, 2019
 "Lies", by Stabbing Westward from Ungod, 1994
 "Lies", by Stan Rogers from Northwest Passage, 1981
 "Lies", by Starbreaker from Starbreaker, 2005
 "Lies", by the Waifs from Sink or Swim, 2000
 "Lies", by Wild Orchid, B-side of the single "Stuttering (Don't Say)", 2001
 "Lies (Through the 80s)", by Manfred Mann's Earth Band from Chance, 1980

People

Surname
 Brian Lies (born 1963), American author and illustrator
 Joseph Lies (1821–1865), Belgian painter

Given name
 Lies Bonnier (born 1925), Dutch swimmer
 Lies Cosijn (1931–2016), Dutch ceramicist
 Lies Eykens (born 1989), Belgian volleyball player
 Lies Jans (born 1974), Belgian politician
 Lies Noor (died 1961), Indonesian actress
 Lies Rustenburg (born 1990), Dutch rower
 Lies Tizioualou (born 1965), Algerian volleyball player
 Lies Visschedijk (born 1974), Dutch actress

See also
 
 Lie (disambiguation)
 Liar (disambiguation)
 Lyse (disambiguation)
 White Lies (disambiguation)